The 2009 European Parliament election in Spain was held on Sunday, 7 June 2009, as part of the EU-wide election to elect the 7th European Parliament. All 50 seats allocated to Spain as per the Treaty of Nice—54 after the Treaty of Lisbon came into force on 1 December 2011—were up for election.

The election saw the first national victory for the People's Party (PP) since the 2000 Spanish general election, scoring 42.1% of the share in its best showing in a European Parliament election to date, as well as its third best in a national election overall. The ruling Spanish Socialist Workers' Party (PSOE), on the other hand, fell to second place with 38.8% of the votes after a cycle of electoral victories starting in 2004. As in the previous election, the result was close, as both parties came within three percentage points of each other. The Coalition for Europe (CEU), the alliance of regionalist and peripheral nationalist parties that came to succeed the late Galeusca–Peoples of Europe coalition, remained in third place with 5.1% of the votes, whereas United Left (IU)—which ran under The Left banner—saw its worst showing in a nationwide election up to that point, barely surpassing 3.7% of the share. On the other hand, the new Union, Progress and Democracy (UPyD) party had a strong performance by comfortably doubling its result from the 2008 Spanish general election, being the only national party that saw a net gain of votes compared to that electoral contest. The abertzale left-supported Internationalist Initiative–Solidarity among Peoples (II–SP) candidacy, which had been initially banned from running by the Supreme Court of Spain but later allowed by the Constitutional Court on the grounds that there was not enough evidence of its ties to the ETA terrorist group, scored 1.1% of the votes nationwide but failed to secure any parliamentary representation.

As the 2009 election was held under the provisions of the Treaty of Nice, Spain was allocated 50 MEP seats which, come Election Day, were distributed as follows: PP 23, PSOE 21, CEU 2, IU–ICV 2, UPyD 1 and EdP–V 1. After the Treaty of Lisbon came into force on 1 December 2011, Spain's delegation was increased to 54, granting additional seats to the PSOE (two) and to PP and CEU (one each) according to their June 2009 election results.

Electoral system
The 50 members of the European Parliament allocated to Spain as per the Treaty of Nice were elected using the D'Hondt method and a closed list proportional representation, with no electoral threshold being applied in order to be entitled to enter seat distribution. Seats were allocated to a single multi-member constituency comprising the entire national territory. Voting was on the basis of universal suffrage, which comprised all nationals and resident non-national European citizens over 18 years of age and in full enjoyment of their political rights. The use of the D'Hondt method might result in an effective threshold depending on the district magnitude.

Outgoing delegation

Parties and candidates
The electoral law allowed for parties and federations registered in the interior ministry, coalitions and groupings of electors to present lists of candidates. Parties and federations intending to form a coalition ahead of an election were required to inform the relevant Electoral Commission within ten days of the election call. In order to be entitled to run, parties, federations, coalitions and groupings of electors needed to secure the signature of at least 15,000 registered electors; this requirement could be lifted and replaced through the signature of at least 50 elected officials—deputies, senators, MEPs or members from the legislative assemblies of autonomous communities or from local city councils. Electors and elected officials were disallowed from signing for more than one list of candidates.

Below is a list of the main parties and electoral alliances which contested the election:

Campaign

Party slogans

Election debates

Opinion polls
The table below lists voting intention estimates in reverse chronological order, showing the most recent first and using the dates when the survey fieldwork was done, as opposed to the date of publication. Where the fieldwork dates are unknown, the date of publication is given instead. The highest percentage figure in each polling survey is displayed with its background shaded in the leading party's colour. If a tie ensues, this is applied to the figures with the highest percentages. The "Lead" column on the right shows the percentage-point difference between the parties with the highest percentages in a given poll. When available, seat projections are also displayed below the voting estimates in a smaller font.

Results

Overall

Distribution by European group

Notes

References
Opinion poll sources

Other

External links
European elections Spain in Europe Politique.

Spain
2009
European Parliament